The Vishera is a river in Perm Krai, Russia, a left bank tributary of the Kama. The Vishera freezes in late October or early November and stays under the ice until the end of April. There are diamond deposits in the basin of the Vishera.

The Vishera used to be part of the Cherdyn Route and is still considered one of the most picturesque rivers of the Urals. It starts on the extreme northeast of Perm Krai, near the border with the Komi Republic and Sverdlovsk Oblast. It flows on the west foothills of Ural Mountains and is a mountain river for most of its length. There are many rapids and shoals in the channel and many rocks along its banks. 

The Vishera Nature Reserve is along the upper reaches of the river.

Geography

Main tributaries 
Main tributaries (from source to mouth):
 Left: Niols, Moyva, Vels, Uls, Akchim, Yazva, Vizhaikha;
 Right: Lypya, Yelma, Bolshaya Vaya, Pisanka, Govorukha, Kolva.

Etymology 
Komi people call the river Viser. Experts in the Komi language noticed that this element is also in names of other rivers in Ural. A. K. Matveyev supposes that Vishera can mean Northern River or Midnight River (in Sami languages).

References

External links 
 Вишера, река, левобережный приток р. Кама, in Encyclopedia of Perm Krai 
 Вишера (река в Пермской обл.), Great Soviet Encyclopedia 

Rivers of Perm Krai